This is a list of statistics for the Men's Slalom in the World Cup 1983/1984.

Calendar

Final point standings

In Men's Slalom World Cup 1983/84 the best 5 results count.

External links
FIS-ski.com - World Cup standings - Slalom 1984

World Cup
FIS Alpine Ski World Cup slalom men's discipline titles